All the Best is the first compilation album by Australian pop singer John Paul Young. Released in November 1977, the album charted at number 40 on the Kent Music Report. The album includes songs from Young's three studio albums Hero, J.P.Y. and Green.

Track listing 
Side A
 "Yesterday's Hero" (Harry Vanda, George Young) – 3:39
 "The Painting"  (H. Vanda, G. Young) – 4:25
 "The Love Game" (H. Vanda, G. Young) – 3:25
 "Birmingham" (H. Vanda, G. Young) – 4:03
 "I Wanna Do It with You" (H. Vanda, G. Young)- 2:57
 "Standing in the Rain"  (H. Vanda, G. Young) – 4:05

Side B
 "I Hate the Music" (H. Vanda, G. Young) – 3:48
 "Pasadena" (David Hemmings, H. Vanda, G. Young) – 3:16
 "Where the Action Is" (H. Vanda, G. Young) – 3:05
 "Here We Go" (Warren Morgan) – 3:38
 "Keep On Smilin'" (H. Vanda, G. Young) – 2:56
 "Gay Time Rock 'N' Roll City"  (W. Morgan, John Paul Young) – 3:44

Charts

Personnel 
Vocals – John Paul Young
Guitar – Harry Vanda, Ian Winter, Phil Manning, Ronnie Peel
Bass – George Young, Ronnie Peel, Dallas McDermott
Keyboards – George Young, Pig Morgan
Drums – George Young, John Proud, Johnny Dick, Spike Nimble
Saxophone – Tony Buchanan
Backing vocals – Vanda & Young

References 

1977 greatest hits albums
John Paul Young albums
Albert Productions compilation albums
Compilation albums by Australian artists